Darcel Yandzi (born 11 June 1973 in Kinshasa, Zaire (now the Democratic Republic of the Congo) is a French judoka who competed at the 1996 Summer Olympics.

Achievements

Video 
 Videos on Judovision.org

References

External links
 

1973 births
Living people
Sportspeople from Kinshasa
French male judoka
Olympic judoka of France
Judoka at the 1996 Summer Olympics
Democratic Republic of the Congo emigrants to France